SDLT may refer to:

 Stamp Duty Land Tax, a tax on property purchase in the United Kingdom
 Digital Linear Tape: Super DLT, a data storage technology